Sport Club Municipal Zalău, commonly known as SCM Zalău, is a Romanian professional football club based in Zalău, Sălaj County. This team represents the football section of the multi-sport club SCM Zalău, which also include athletics, boxing, tennis, table tennis, Greco-Roman wrestling and handball (youth).

SCM Zalău was established on 27 June 2019 and is fully supported by the Municipality of Zalău. The football section of SCM was enrolled directly in the Liga III, on the place of newly promoted Unirea Mirșid, club that gave up its place and right to play in the third tier. The new team continues the legacy of Zalău football, legacy started by Armătura Zalău and continued by FC Zalău, however, having no official connection (legal or ideological) with any of them.

History

Armătura and FC Zalău (1949–2017)
FC Armătura Zalău was founded in 1946 as CS Zalău and since 1975 was owned by Armătura Zalău, main factory of the city, with the field of activity "Iron and Steel Industrial Fittings". Armătura was the most representative football team of Zalău and Sălaj County, playing at the national level and at its best, in the second tier (Liga II). Over time, notable players such as Mircea Bolba, Alin Chibulcutean, Claudiu Cornaci, Vasile Dobrău, Adrian Gongolea, Vasile Jula, Florin Sabou or Gabriel Vașvari wore the red and black kits of Armătura and managers such as Leontin Grozavu or Iosif Vigu, among others, led "the Steelworkes" from the technical bench. After 1990 the factory's activity started to decline and since 2000, Liviu Olar Pop, a local businessman was the main sponsor of the football team. In 2005, Pop decided to withdraw its support and Armătura was dissolved.

FC Zalău was founded in the spring of 2006, in order to continue Zalău's football legacy. The founder and owner of the new team was Ioan Morar, a local businessman, as well as a former business partner of Liviu Olar Pop. The club was enrolled in the Liga IV (4th tier) and after two defeats in the promotion play-offs (0–1 in 2006, against U Cluj 1919 and 2–3 in 2007, against Bihor II Oradea) FC Zalău was finally promoted at the end of the 2007–08 season. Zălăuanii won their third promotion play-off, 1–0, against Spicul Mocira, then played for 9 years at the level of Liga III and even had intentions to promote in the second tier, at some time, but was finally dissolved in the summer of 2017, due to financial problems.

SCM Zalău, a new beginning (2019–present)
SCM Zalău was established on 27 June 2019 and was enrolled directly in the Liga III, on the place of newly promoted Unirea Mirșid, club that gave up its place and right to play in the third tier. The new team continues the legacy of Zalău football, legacy started by Armătura Zalău and continued by FC Zalău, however, having no official connection (legal or ideological) with any of them.

Ground

SCM Zalău, like its predecessor, Armătura and FC Zalău, plays its home matches on Municipal Stadium in Zalău, with a capacity of 3,500 seats. The stadium was also temporary the home ground of other football teams and is also used as a multi-purpose stadium.

Honours
Liga III
Runners-up (1): 2020–21

Players

First-team squad

Out on loan

Club Officials

Board of directors

Current technical staff

League history

References

External links
 
 

Football clubs in Sălaj County
Association football clubs established in 2019
Liga III clubs
2019 establishments in Romania